EyeCarePro Inc. is a digital marketing company focused on optometrists in the US and Canada. The company's CEO is Daniel Rostenne. The company's target audience includes eye care professionals, family practices and corporate groups. Services include client management systems and a variety of web and digital marketing services geared toward eyecare professionals.

Services
The company offers digital services geared toward eye care professionals, including website development and marketing services such as Search Engine Optimization, social media, email campaigns, Google Ads, and online marketing services.

Since 2017, EyeCarePro has developed software to include a Google review app, which assists in requesting reviews.

In 2018, EyeCarePro launched GetSetPro, a family of proprietary apps that simplify website updates, social media campaign management, real-time appointment bookings, manage vendor and frame listings, as well as other functions pertaining to a practice's online presence and operations.

Optometrists Network
In 2019, EyeCarePro acquired the Optometrists Network's assets, expanding the group's services for optometric medical specializations. These include the related networks of vision therapy and neuro-optometric rehabilitation-related domains, such as strabismus.org and braininjury.org.

Industry development
The company was instrumental in forming the Energies Association, also known as the American Association of Corporate Optometrists (AACO). Energy is a representative association for corporate optometrists in North America. The initiative was borne from a partnership between EyeCarePro, Walmart, and industry professionals. EyeCarePro's management team member served as the first executive director and as a managing partner for Energies Association.

See also
Eye care professional
Medical software

References

Technology companies of Canada